Rugg Williams is an American actor, director producer, writer and author who co-starred in the crime drama In the Heat of the Night with Carroll O'Connor for four seasons as Eugene Glendon, Denise Nicholas' troubled son. Prior to this, he appeared in TV shows such as Tattooed Teenage Alien Fighters from Beverly Hills, Family Matters, Hunter, and Haunted Lives: True Ghost Stories.

Life and career
A native of Washington, D.C., Rugg holds degrees in business management and marketing. After relocating to Los Angeles, he attended the  American Academy of Dramatic Arts where he performed in such productions as Picnic, A Taste of Honey and Othello. He has since then performed in over sixty stage productions including The Mighty Gents, The Pajama Game, Slow Down the Night, the national tour of God's Trying to Tell You Something and A Soldier's Play. The NAACP Theatre Committee and the L.A Weekly Theatre Awards have honored him for his work in Ted Lange’s Tinseltown Trilogy. His most prominent stage performance was at the Pasadena Playhouse, in the award-winning play Mr. Ricky Calls a Meeting, directed by Sheldon Epps.
 
Rugg is best known for his portrayal of Eugene Glendon on In the Heat of the Night for four seasons, playing opposite the late Carroll O'Connor and Denise Nicholas. His other television credits include Dangerous Minds, Family Matters, Silk Stalkings, Hunter, Real Ghosts, a guest-starring role in CBS’ MOW Crosses on the Lawn, a recurring role on Beverly Hills, 90210, Sister, Sister and Walker, Texas Ranger. Rugg has also captured roles in films such as Good Kids Die Too, Family Prayers, Biker Boyz, Renegade Radio, Trippin' and Social Misfits. When Rugg was cast in BET’s original comedy sketch show L.A. Friday's, he was also hired on as one of the show's writers.

After a successful run as a working actor in Hollywood, Rugg was cast in the long-running stage play Jonin'. He became one of the show's producers. The play was then re-cast with new director Tommy Ford and went on to run another successful year.
 
Rugg wrote and directed his own film short, Lost and Found, about a young homeless boy who finds a wallet with a winning lottery ticket inside. That led to him assembling several television premises and pilots to develop along with a catalog of feature films.

Rugg co-created and produced the pilot of Calvin and Freddie’s Cosmic Encounters starring his own sons Oren Williams (Rebound) and Zachary Isaiah Williams (Honey). 
 
Rugg is also the co-author of the book ShowBiz Kidz... How to Get Your Child Started in Show Business.

Now as an executive for Intrepid Entertainment Group, Inc with a catalog of projects from television, features and reality shows, Rugg is well on his way to becoming a sought-after creative force in Hollywood. He is the Co-Executive Producer and Director of the sketch comedy series; Sketchy now streaming on urbanflixtv.com and the Creator, Director and Producer of the hilarious comedy series Millennials, starring Kyle Massey, King Keraun and Philip Daniel Bolden which began streaming on allblk.tv in 2021.

Filmography

 2003 Maniac Magee  (TV movie) || Man || (uncredited)
 2003 Biker Boyz  || Clean Cut Guy || (uncredited)
 2001 Social Misfits  ||  Malcolm ||
 1999 Unbowed  || Lewis ||
 1999 Trippin'  || Rich Boy ||
 1999 Michael Jordan: An American Hero  (TV movie)  || Del Shawn ||
 1998 Sister, Sister (TV series) || Michael ||
 1998 Home Sweet Dorm  || Michael ||
 1997 Walker, Texas Ranger  (TV series) || Clifton Harris || episode "Mr. Justice"
 1992-1997 Family Matters  (TV series) || Laura's Study Partner || Rick ||
 1996 Dangerous Minds  (TV series) || Worker #1 ||
 1996 Beverly Hills, 90210  (TV series) || Floor Director ||
 1994-1995 Tattooed Teenage Alien Fighters from Beverly Hills  (TV series) || Swinton Sawyer || 35 episodes
 1995 Real Ghosts  aka Haunted Lives: True Ghost Stories  (TV Series) || Mike ||
 1990-1994 In the Heat of the Night (TV series) || Eugene Glendon || 9 episodes
 1994 Victor One  aka Undercover Cop 
1993 CBS Schoolbreak Special (TV series) Chris Hawkins
– Crosses on the Lawn (1993) … Chris Hawkins
1993 Family Prayers Activist #2
1993 Silk Stalkings (TV series) 
– Crush (1993)
1990 Hunter (TV series) Randy Ellis
– The Incident (1990) … Randy Ellis
1989 Growing Pains (TV series) Guy
– Fish Bait (1989) … Guy
1998 The Players Club (ADR voice) (uncredited)
1995 The Tuskegee Airmen (TV movie) (ADR voice) (uncredited)
1992 South Central (ADR voice) (uncredited)

References

https://variety.com/2020/tv/news/millennials-multi-cam-comedy-rugg-williams-oren-williams-umc-1234758443/
https://deadline.com/2020/09/millennials-umc-cast-1234581571/
https://shadowandact.com/thats-so-raven-are-we-there-yet-alums-to-star-in-millennials-comedy-series-directed-by-martin-showrunner
http://www.tvguide.com/celebrities/rugg-williams/267991
http://www.film.com/movies/unbowed/14704680

External links

https://www.facebook.com/profile.php?id=100000867263432

Year of birth missing (living people)
Living people
Male actors from Los Angeles
Male actors from Washington, D.C.
American male television actors